Besik “Beso” Gavasheli (Born 7 December 1988 in Georgia, Tbilisi) is a Professional Georgian cyclist who is the seven-time Georgian Mountain Bike Champion, a two-time Georgian Individual Time Trial National Champion, and a participant in the first 2015 European Games in Baku.

References

External links
Besik Gavasheli at procyclingstats.com

1988 births
Living people
Male cyclists from Georgia (country)
Cyclists at the 2015 European Games
European Games competitors for Georgia (country)